1904 Országos Bajnokság I (men's water polo) was the first water polo championship hold in Hungary. It was organised by the swimming division of the Hungarian Athletes' Association. There were four participating teams in the championship. There was only one round. All the matches were held in Császárfüddő during the first three weekends of September.

Best team of the previous years, MUE did not take part in the championship, because some swimmers were not satisfied with the leadership in connection with the Olympics held in St. Louis.

Final list

* M: Matches W: Win D: Drawn L: Lost G+: Goals earned G-: Goals got P: Point

Sources 
Gyarmati Dezső: Aranykor (Hérodotosz Könyvkiadó és Értékesítő Bt., Budapest, 2002.)

1904 in water polo
1904 in Hungarian sport
Seasons in Hungarian water polo competitions